"Skeletons" is the third single from the Yeah Yeah Yeahs' third album It's Blitz!. The 7" edition of the single, limited to 500 copies, was released on March 1, 2010. The single was also released on January 31, 2010, in the iTunes Store.
Icelandic band Of Monsters and Men covered the song in 2013.

Cover artwork
The photograph on the 7" vinyl sleeve was created by the band's guitarist Nick Zinner, who is a professional photographer. The artwork features a barn in rural Massachusetts during a snowstorm, and is a reference to the location where the song was written.

Track list

Record Store Day Release
A limited edition 7" 33 RPM vinyl copy of "Skeletons" was released for Record Store Day in 2010. The record contained the single, as well as, a B-side of the song being played live at the Music Hall of Williamsburg in Brooklyn New York. The live version of the song was mixed and engineered by Harley Zinker and Tom Carlisle at Fireplace Studios in New York.

References

External links

2010 singles
Yeah Yeah Yeahs songs
American new wave songs
Song recordings produced by Nick Launay
Songs written by Karen O
Songs written by Brian Chase
2009 songs
Interscope Records singles
Songs written by Nick Zinner